The 1950 Divizia B was the 11th season of the second tier of the Romanian football league system.

The format with two series has been maintained, but each of them having 12 teams instead of 14. At the end of the season the winners of the series promoted to Divizia A and the last two places from each one of the series relegated to District Championship. Also this was the first season played in the spring-autumn system, a system imposed by the new leadership of the country which were in close ties with the Soviet Union.

Team changes

To Divizia B
Promoted from Divizia C
 Armata Cluj
 CFR Iași
 Metalosport Oțelu Roșu
 Progresul ICAS București

Relegated from Divizia A
 CFR Cluj
 CSU Cluj
 Metalochimic București
 Gaz Metan Mediaș

From Divizia B
Relegated to Divizia C
 Arsenal Sibiu
 Dermata Cluj
 CFR Ploiești
 CFR Turnu Severin
 Grivița CFR București
 Solvay Uioara
 Dezrobirea Constanța
 CAM Timișoara
 FC Călărași
 Șurianul Sebeș

Promoted to Divizia A
 CFR Sibiu
 Metalochimic Reșița

Renamed teams 
Most of the teams have changed their names to have Soviet, communist, military or working class related inspiration. Among the popular names used were: Partizanul (The Partisan), Flamura Roșie (The Red Flag) or Metalul (The Metal), but also some inspired directly from the Moscow teams: Dinamo, Locomotiv or Spartac being the Romanian alternatives for Dynamo, Lokomotiv and Spartak.

ARLUS Bacău was renamed as Flamura Roșie Bacău.

Astra Română Moreni was renamed as Partizanul Moreni.

CFR Arad was renamed as Locomotiva Arad.

CFR Cluj was renamed as Locomotiva Cluj.

CFR Galați was renamed as Locomotiva Galați.

CFR Iași was renamed as Locomotiva Iași.

CFR Oradea was renamed as Locomotiva Oradea.

CFR Satu Mare was renamed as Locomotiva Satu Mare.

Concordia Ploiești was renamed as Partizanul Ploiești.

CSM Baia Mare was renamed as Metalul Baia Mare.

CSU Cluj was renamed as Știința Cluj.

Dinamo B București was moved to Orașul Stalin and renamed as Dinamo Orașul Stalin.

Gaz Metan Mediaș was renamed as Partizanul Mediaș.

IS Câmpia Turzii was renamed as Metalul Câmpia Turzii.

Metalochimic București was renamed as Metalul București.

Metalosport Oțelu Roșu was renamed as Metalul Oțelu Roșu.

Mica Brad was renamed as Metalul Brad.

Minerul Lupeni was renamed as Partizanul Lupeni.

Politehnica Iași was renamed as Știința Iași.

Textila Sfântu Gheorghe was renamed as Flamura Roșie Sfântu Gheorghe.

Țesătoria Română Pitești was renamed as Flamura Roșie Pitești.

Other teams 
Socec București and Banca de Stat București merged, Socec being absorbed by Banca de Stat, which also took its place in the second league and was renamed as Spartac București.

League tables

Serie I

Serie II

See also 

 1950 Divizia A

References

Liga II seasons
Romania
Romania
2
2